The 1984 British Speedway Championship was the 24th edition of the British Speedway Championship. The Final took place on 20 June at Brandon in Coventry, England. The Championship was won by Kenny Carter, with Andy Grahame edging out Dave Jessup for second place.

Final 
20 June 1984
 Brandon Stadium, Coventry

See also 
 British Speedway Championship
 1984 Individual Speedway World Championship

References 

British Speedway Championship
Great Britain